Milan Perič may refer to:

 Milan Perič (artist) (born 1957), Czech painter and musician
 Milan Perič (cyclist) (1928–1967), Czech cyclist

See also
 Milan Perić (born 1986), Serbian footballer